E 982 is a European B class road, connecting the cities Mersin and Tarsus on the southern coast of Turkey. It lies ~380 kilometres south east of Ankara. It runs from the junction with the D400 near the town of Hürriyet, south west of Mersin, to the junction with E90 and the O-21, near the town of Çamtepe, north east of Tarsus. It has a length of 67 kilometres, and consists entirely of motorway. It is part of the road with the Turkish national designation O-51.

External links 
 UN Economic Commission for Europe: Overall Map of E-road Network (2007)

International E-road network
Roads in Turkey